Xia Yan (1482–1548), courtesy name Gongjin, was a Chinese politician of the Ming dynasty.

Biography

Early life and career 

Xia was born in Guixi, Jiangxi. His father, Xia Ding, was the subprefectural magistrate of Linqing.

In the early reign of the Jiajing Emperor, the emperor paid more attention on ceremony. Xia rationalized the emperor's grand scheme for four separate sacrifices to Heaven, Earth, the Sun, and the Moon, and endorsed it. Thus, he gained the emperor's favor.

When the Jiajing Emperor went back to Zhongxiang and prayed at Xianling Tomb, Yan Song requested to let officials convey their congratulations. But Xia delayed the congratulations until they were back to Beijing, which depressed the emperor. Then one day, the emperor visited Changping, Xia was late for the reception. This infuriated the emperor, and Xia was reprimanded for his discourtesy. The emperor pointed out that Xia had originally been recommended for promotion from a minor post and that he enjoyed his high status at the emperor's pleasure, thus the emperor issued an order to strip Xia's title, left him a minor one and forced him to retire. Within a matter of days, the emperor relented and prevented Xia from heading home. The punishment was quashed in the end.

Fall from grace 
There was a censor Gao Shi as Xia's closet friend. With his support, Xia Yan caused his political adversary Guo Xun to be imprisoned in 1541 until his death in the next year. Xia had previously disagreed with Guo Xun's proposal to move the crown prince into one of the two inner palaces that became vacated due to the deaths of two empresses. But  when the emperor consulted him, on the issue, Xia made self-contradictory comments that appeared to take Guo Xun's side in the end. Finding it highly objectionable, the emperor began to suspect the censors involved in Guo's case. The emperor also ordered to keep Xia under constant surveillance, and noticed Xia was too indolent to draft the imperial edicts.

Although Xia had taken part in various Taoist ceremonies during the 1530s, he was not an enthusiastic participant in the 1540s. On July 1542 the emperor asked several high-ranking officials to ride a horse to work, he also granted them xiangye jin (a special headgear as something between laurel wreath and kerchief for Taoist rituals, it may be made from leaves of Aquilaria sinensis) to wear. Xia Yan was the only one to refuse; he took a litter and wore the normal trappings, since he thought the wreath violated the rites.

Animosity and retirement 
Yan Song seized these opportunities to oust Xia. Yan was promoted to be the Minister of Rites with Xia's help. Nevertheless, they had feuded since Yan entered the Grand Secretariat. Yan conformed with the emperor's expectations as Xia's counter, so he won favour. On one occasion, Yan Song listed Xia's faults to the emperor, especially noting how Xia engineered Guo Xun's downfall. The emperor reproached Xia furiously:(Since Guo Xun had been imprisoned, why did Xia Yan fabricate evidence against him, still? The censors ought to be the ears and eyes of the court, how dared Xia to control them as puppets? If I don't hold court in the morning, neither Xia went to the Grand Secretary. Such significant military and political affairs related to national security, Xia actually made decisions at home in private. Xia regards the classified words I uttered as a trifling matter. The censors are blind to these situations, they merely cheated and defamed me. What you have done incur the wrath of gods, the heavy rains had destroyed crops.) Xia became frightened, he not only apologised but also submitted his resignation to the emperor. Just then a solar eclipse took place. The emperor gave another edict, blaming the officials' misconduct for the abnormal eclipse, and sanctioned Xia's resignation. Many officials expressed their desire to share the responsibility with Xia. The emperor was outraged by their memorials taking Xia Yan's side and punished them. Thirteen officials were exiled in total, and Gao Shi was banished to the frontiers for his impeachment of Guo Xun.

Back to Beijing 
Xia's influence was on the skids since 1539. Being angered by Yan's presumptuousness, the Jiajing Emperor longed for a sense of balance. Xia was recalled to Beijing in 1545 as a counterbalance to Yan. Again, they competed fiercely for dominance of the imperial court.

When Xia became the Senior Grand Secretary again, he vented his anger by excluding Yan Song from the court affairs, and even exiled the officials that Yan Song had promoted. However, Yan did not dare to resist. Widespread disgust at Yan made Xia popular among his peers and the subordinate officers.

Meanwhile, Xia Yan's growing arrogance had offended various persons at court, including the eunuchs, who began to speak disparagingly of Xia in the emperor's presence. The emperor also became increasingly dissatisfied with Xia's qingci (green poetry; a special poetry for prayer in the Taoist ceremony which was written on a green paper). Xia was not in favour any longer.

Death 
Later, the Supreme Commander of Shaanxi Zeng Xian appealed to the emperor to recover Hetao. Xia sought backing from the emperor for this proposal, which the emperor initially took a liking to. In February 1548, however, he suddenly withdrew support. Yan Song disassociated himself from this campaign, and indicated that Xia should be blamed for such an impracticable operation.

At the same time, there was a rumour going around against Xia, which made the emperor more angry. He scolded Xia, then stripped of Xia's official title and privileges in the beginning of 1548, but had no intention of executing Xia.

There was a gossip that Xia expressed resentment at being punished by the emperor, while Yan kept fabricating evidence against Xia. Thus, the emperor was furious, he ordered to kill Zeng and incarcerate Xia.

Heard that he was implicated in Zeng's case as soon as he arrived in Tongzhou, Xia was so scared that fell off his carriage, saying "Alas! I have to die!". He fought to prove his innocence and affirmed that Yan set him up, but his letter to the emperor failed to redress. Several senior officials attempted to intercede with the emperor, the latter not only refused, but also kept all their wages. Perhaps what rankled the emperor was Xia's arrogance rather than the apparent contention. Eventually, Xia was executed at the market publicly on 31 October 1548, following Zeng Xian's death in April. Xia's wife was exiled to Guangxi.

Family 
Xia's wife came from Su clan, Su had no child, while Xia's concubine was pregnant, Su envied and forced her to remarry. The latter gave birth to a boy, Su got him back after Xia's death. He died when he was about to be an official, so Xia had no descendant eventually.

Notes

References 

 

1482 births
1548 deaths
Senior Grand Secretaries of the Ming dynasty
Politicians from Yingtan
Executed Ming dynasty people
People executed by the Ming dynasty by decapitation